The Central American agouti (Dasyprocta punctata) is a species of agouti from the family Dasyproctidae. The main portion of its range is from Chiapas and the Yucatan Peninsula (southern Mexico), through Central America, to northwestern Ecuador, Colombia and far western Venezuela. A highly disjunct population is found in southeastern Peru, far southwestern Brazil, Bolivia, western Paraguay and far northwestern Argentina. The disjunct population has been treated as a separate species, the brown agouti (Dasyprocta variegata), but a major review of the geographic variation is necessary. The Central American agouti has also been introduced to Cuba and the Cayman Islands.

Though some populations are reduced due to hunting and deforestation, large populations remain and it is not considered threatened.

Appearance

Central American agoutis from the main part of their range weigh  and are typically reddish, orange or yellowish grizzled with black. In northern Colombia, western Venezuela, and on the Atlantic slope of Costa Rica and Panama the foreparts are brownish or blackish grizzled with tawny or olivaceous, the mid-body is orange, and the rump is black or cream. In western Colombia and Ecuador some have tawny foreparts and yellowish to the rump. Agoutis from the disjunct southern population (Peru, Brazil, Bolivia, Paraguay and Argentina) which sometimes are treated as a separate species, Dasyprocta variegata, weigh  and are grizzled brown, yellowish and black, or grizzled black and orange.

Behavior
Like other agoutis, Central American agoutis are diurnal and live in monogamous pairs. They mainly feed on fruits and seeds, and are important seed dispersers.

References

External links
Decker, J. 2000. "Dasyprocta punctata", Animal Diversity Web. Accessed November 26, 2008

Dasyprocta
Mammals of Colombia
Mammals of Central America
Mammals of Ecuador
Mammals of Cuba
Mammals of Venezuela
Mammals of the Caribbean
Rodents of Central America
Articles containing video clips
Mammals described in 1842
Taxa named by John Edward Gray